Sun Yue (孙玥; born March 31, 1973) is a female Chinese volleyball player who is predominantly an outside hitter. She was a member of the China women's national volleyball team that won the Silver medal at the 1996 Summer Olympics.

Career
Sun played the 1992 Barcelona Olympic Games placing seventh, the 1996 Atlanta Olympic Games, winning the silver medal and the 2000 Sydney Olympic Games where she ranked fifth. She finished in eighth place in the 1994 World Championship and won the silver medal in the 1998 World Championship. Sun was bronze medalist in the 1995 World Cup and ranked fifth in the 1999 edition.

Awards

National team

Senior team 
 1995 World Cup -  Bronze Medal
 1996 Atlanta Olympic Games -  Silver Medal
 1998 World Championship -  Silver Medal

References

External links
 中國女排官方網頁

1973 births
Living people
Chinese women's volleyball players
Volleyball players at the 1992 Summer Olympics
Volleyball players at the 1996 Summer Olympics
Volleyball players at the 2000 Summer Olympics
Olympic volleyball players of China
Olympic silver medalists for China
Volleyball players from Jiangsu
Olympic medalists in volleyball
Sportspeople from Nanjing
Asian Games medalists in volleyball
Volleyball players at the 1994 Asian Games
Volleyball players at the 1998 Asian Games
Medalists at the 1996 Summer Olympics
Medalists at the 1994 Asian Games
Medalists at the 1998 Asian Games
Asian Games gold medalists for China
Asian Games silver medalists for China
20th-century Chinese women